Grace Elizabeth Loh (born 1 August 1991) is a competitive Australian swimmer. She was Australia's first World Junior Swimming Champion.

Loh won the women's 50m and 100m backstroke events at the 2nd FINA Youth World Swimming Championships in Monterrey, Mexico. The competition ran from 8 to 13 July 2008, and attracted over 600 swimmers from over 66 countries with strong contingents from major swimming nations (including USA, Great Britain, Russia and Japan).

At the Australian Short Course Championship held in Melbourne from 20–24 September 2008, Loh won her first national title in the 100m backstroke, following up with a silver medal in the 50m sprint event.

At the 2010 Telstra Australian Swimming Championships she came 3rd in the 50m Backstroke in 28.52

Loh also came first in the 3rd heat of the 50m backstroke at the 2010 Commonwealth Games in Delhi, finishing 5th in the final.

References

External links
 
 

1991 births
Australian female backstroke swimmers
Living people
Swimmers from Melbourne
Swimmers at the 2010 Commonwealth Games
Universiade medalists in swimming
Universiade bronze medalists for Australia
Medalists at the 2011 Summer Universiade
Commonwealth Games competitors for Australia
21st-century Australian women
People from Kew, Victoria